Club Atlético Nacional Emilio Alave is a Bolivian football club based in Potosí, Potosí. The club is the runners-up of 2011–2012 Potosí championship and competes in the 2012 Copa Bolivia. The club play their matches in Estadio San Cristóbal. The club has the Escuela de Fútbol Emilio Alave.

Football clubs in Bolivia
Potosí